Very Good Girls is a 2013 American drama film and the first feature film directed by American screenwriter Naomi Foner, whose script for drama Running on Empty was Oscar-nominated. First screened publicly in early 2013, the film stars Dakota Fanning and Elizabeth Olsen as two friends who fall for the same man (Boyd Holbrook). The film premiered at the Sundance Film Festival on January 22, 2013; it was given a release on home formats on June 24, 2014.

The supporting cast includes Demi Moore, Richard Dreyfuss, Ellen Barkin, Clark Gregg, and Peter Sarsgaard. The film was produced by Norton Herrick, Michael London, and Mary Jane Skalski.

Plot
Best friends Lilly and Gerri spend their last summer in New York together. At Brighton Beach, they muse about swimming nude before Gerri suddenly takes off her shirt and runs into the water, followed by Lilly. On their way back home, they meet David, a guy selling ice cream. After an awkward conversation, David takes a picture of Lilly from the back.

Arriving home, Lilly sees her father with a woman in the office. She takes comfort in spending the evening with Gerri's family, who are loud and open in contrast to Lilly's stony mother and absent father. The girls talk and vow to lose their virginity before leaving for college.

As Lilly walks to work as a boat tour guide in Manhattan, David watches from a distance. He shows interest in her which she doesn't tell Gerri about, while Gerri exhibits an affection for him despite the lack of reciprocation, and despite neither girl knowing him well. David asks Lilly out, and she agrees.

Lilly's mother learns about her father's affair and asks him to leave, against Lilly's wishes. She begins to hang out with David and they kiss. Gerri invites David to an open mic night where she sings a song she wrote for him, while out of her sight, David takes Lilly's hand and holds it under the table.

Lilly's boss flirts with her, offering lucrative night shifts with an obvious implication. Walking home, she sees David waiting outside her house; they kiss and have sex in the garage. The next morning Lilly bumps into her father who apologizes, asking her to have dinner with him, which she declines. Afterward, David sneaks in through the bathroom window. They shower together before spending the day flocking around the city. They arrive at a basketball court where a stylishly dressed man strips to his underwear and dances ballet liberatingly. Kids join him while David videos.

Later in the evening, Lilly learns that Gerri's father died after collapsing in the subway. She leaves David to be with a despairing Gerri. Sharing her grief encourages Lilly to ask her mother to forgive her father. Gerri tells Lilly she can't stop thinking about David. Guiltily, Lilly rejects David's attempts to meet again. He confronts her and she rebuffs him, asking him to meet up with Gerri, but is dismayed when David complies. He comforts Gerri and they kiss in her backyard garden, which Lilly sees.

At her father's memorial service, Gerri tells Lilly she lost her virginity to David, prompting her to see her boss and agree to his advances. They kiss in the tour boat, but then she changes her mind. However, when she confronts David about having sex with Gerri and he does not respond, she lies and tells him she had sex with her boss. The next day, Lilly surprisingly finds her parents cooking in the kitchen as her mother has forgiven her father. David shows up, claiming he didn't sleep with Gerri, and Lilly storms off.

Gerri tells Lilly that David is leaving for Paris, so Lilly finds him, admitting she didn't sleep with her boss. Angry, David warns her not to manipulate other people's feelings but still kisses her goodbye before leaving in a cab. As Lilly walks away, Gerri confronts her furiously, having overheard their conversation.

Lilly makes amends with her father and he suggests she ask for forgiveness, but she does not take his advice. The morning before leaving for college, Gerri comes over with a photograph David sent her for Lilly, his way of making sure the girls saw each other before she left. Gerri reveals she never actually had sex with David, she asked him to but he told her he was already in love with someone else. The girls make up, taking off their clothes to dance in the sprinklers.

Cast

 Dakota Fanning as Lilly Berger
 Elizabeth Olsen as Gerri Fields
 Boyd Holbrook as David Avery
 Demi Moore as Kate Fields, Gerri's Mother
 Richard Dreyfuss as Danny Fields, Gerri's Father
 Ellen Barkin as Norma Berger, Lilly's Mother
 Clark Gregg as Edward Berger, Lilly's Father
 Kiernan Shipka as Eleanor Berger, Lilly's Sister
 Peter Sarsgaard as Fitzsimmons, Lilly's Summertime Job Boss
 Owen Campbell as Karl

Production
Production company Herrick Entertainment announced on July 20, 2012, that principal photography had begun in New York City. Herrick was producing and financing the project, with Michael London's Groundswell Productions also producing.

Shooting locations included Ditmas Park, Brooklyn.

Cast-member Peter Sarsgaard is the son-in-law of writer-director Naomi Foner, who is the mother of his wife, Maggie Gyllenhaal.

In January 2012, Anton Yelchin was in final negotiations to play a role in the film, but he dropped out due to scheduling conflicts and was replaced with Boyd Holbrook.

Release
The film was released on June 6, 2014 through iTunes, Amazon Video, Vudu, and VOD. The film started a limited theatrical release in the United States on July 25, 2014.

Reception
The film received negative reviews from critics. It has accumulated a 19% rotten rating on Rotten Tomatoes based on 36 reviews. David Rooney of The Hollywood Reporter described the film as "a limp directing debut" for Foner, claiming the film's outdated "counter-culture" sensibilities made it appear "frozen in time". Rooney also found the characters unconvincing and criticized the "artificiality" of the love interest who asks the lead character to "read a couple of lines of Sylvia Plath before their first kiss". We Got This Covered called the film "insincere from bottom to top," expressing disappointment that "its innate lousiness" deflated the dramatic efforts of its leads. Variety criticized the "vapid and clichéd" screenplay, while Susan Wloszczyna of RogerEbert.com compared the film negatively to 1980's Little Darlings, which shares a plot element with Very Good Girls.

Bilge Ebiri of Vulture did not find the film's love triangle to be plausible, but stated, "In these and other works, [Naomi] Foner displayed a real feel for the various undercurrents that rage within families, both happy and broken ones. She understands how irritation can transform into profound need at a moment's notice, as well as how happiness can quickly turn rotten. Very Good Girls is full of memorable, subtle touches that come through whenever Foner seems to be working to her strengths." He concluded that "what's actually happening onscreen often feels a lot less interesting than what's clearly boiling beneath the film's surface."

References

External links

2013 films
Films about sexuality
Films about virginity
2013 drama films
Films shot in New York City
Films set in New York City
American independent films
2013 directorial debut films
2013 independent films
American female buddy films
2010s female buddy films
2010s English-language films
2010s American films